Aseem also spelled Asim, Aasim or Aashim is an Indian masculine given name meaning 'unlimited/limitless/infinite'. It is not related to the often identically spelt name of Arabic origin Asim.

Notable people with the name include:
Asim Basu, Indian artist
Aseem Batra, Indian-american television director, producer and actress
Asim Dasgupta, Indian economist and former minister of finance of West Bengal
Asim Ghosh, Canadian Indian engineer
Asim Gope, Bangladeshi Hindu field hockey player
Aashim Gulati, Indian actor
Aseem Malhotra, Indian politician
Aseem Malhotra, British cardiologist
Aseem Merchant, Indian actor
Aseem Mishra, Indian cinematographer
Asim Mukhopadhyay, Indian mountaineer
Aseem Pereira, Brazilian artist
Aseem Prakash, American Indian political scientist
Aseem Shukla, American urologist and religious advocate
Asim Kumar Sarkar, Indian politician and folk singer
Aseem Trivedi, Indian cartoonist

References 

Given names
Indian given names
Indian masculine given names
Hindu given names